Neil Anthony Staite (born 1963), is a male former rower who competed for Great Britain and England.

Rowing career
Staite represented Great Britain in six World Championships. He represented England and won a gold medal in the lightweight coxless four, at the 1986 Commonwealth Games in Edinburgh, Scotland.

References

1963 births
English male rowers
Commonwealth Games medallists in rowing
Commonwealth Games gold medallists for England
Rowers at the 1986 Commonwealth Games
Sportspeople from Gloucestershire
Living people
World Rowing Championships medalists for Great Britain
Medallists at the 1986 Commonwealth Games